The 1913 LSU Tigers football team represented the LSU Tigers of Louisiana State University during the 1913 Southern Intercollegiate Athletic Association football season. The team was captained by center Tom Dutton. At guards were T. R. Mobley and Arthur Klock. In the backfield was quarterback Lawrence Dupont and fullback Alf Reid. Dupont had 15 touchdowns in 1913, four of them coming on November 22 in a game against rival Tulane in a 40–0 victory.

Coach Pat Dwyer used Dutton for a "kangaroo play" in which Dupont would crawl between Dutton's legs; supposedly very effective in short yardage situations.

Schedule

References

LSU
LSU Tigers football seasons
LSU Tigers football